Kologrivsky District is an administrative and municipal district (raion), one of the twenty-four in Kostroma Oblast, Russia. It is located in the north of the oblast. Its administrative center is the town of Kologriv. Population:  8,566 (2002 Census);  The population of Kologriv accounts for 56.5% of the district's total population.

References

Notes

Sources

 
Districts of Kostroma Oblast